Alpujarra Almeriense is a Spanish comarca in the Province of Almería, Andalusia. Along with Alpujarra Granadina, is part of the Andalusian region of the Alpujarras.

Overview
Located in the east of Alpujarra, it borders with the comarcas of Filabres-Tabernas, Almería (metropolitan comarca), Poniente Almeriense, and with the Granadian ones of Accitania (Guadix) and Alpujarra Granadina.

Subdivision
The comarca is divided into 22 municipalities (municipios): (Population -2005- shown under bracket):

Alboloduy (698)
Alcolea (916)
Alhabia (706)
Alhama de Almería (3,835)
Alicún (278)
Almócita (191)
Alsodux (153)
Bayárcal (403)
Beires (118)
Bentarique (277)
Canjáyar (1,451)
Fondón (976)
Huécija (530)
Íllar (452)
Instinción (484)
Laujar de Andarax (1,819)
Ohanes (745)
Padules (510)
Paterna del Río (440)
Rágol (379)
Santa Cruz de Marchena (240)
Terque (455)

See also
Alpujarra Granadina
Morisco Revolt

References

External links

Visit Alpujarras: your holiday quide, travel information and rural accommodation
 History, pictures and infos about the Alpujarras

Comarcas of Andalusia
Geography of the Province of Almería